Christmas Carousel is a 1960 studio album (see 1960 in music) by Peggy Lee, arranged by Billy May.

Some of the album's tracks were reissued, along with three newly recorded songs, on Lee's 1965 album Happy Holiday.

Track listing
"I Like a Sleighride (Jingle Bells)" (Traditional) - 2:03
"The Christmas Song" (Mel Tormé, Robert Wells) - 2:19
"Don't Forget to Feed the Reindeer" (Peggy Lee) - 2:46
"The Star Carol" (A.S. Burt, Wihla Hutson) - 2:35
"The Christmas List" (Lee) - 2:38
"Christmas Carousel" (Lee) - 2:26
"Santa Claus Is Coming to Town" (J. Fred Coots, Haven Gillespie) - 2:16
"The Christmas Waltz" (Sammy Cahn, Jule Styne) - 2:55
"The Christmas Riddle" (Lee, Stella Castelucci) - 3:18
"The Tree" (Lee) - 1:41
"Deck the Halls" (Traditional) - 2:10
"White Christmas" (Irving Berlin) - 2:01
Bonus tracks issued on the 1994 CD release

"Winter Wonderland" (Felix Bernard, Richard B. Smith) - 1:51
"Little Drummer Boy" (Katherine Kennicott Davis) - 2:12
"Happy Holiday" (Irving Berlin) - 1:51
"The Christmas Spell" (Jack Palmer, Willard Robison) - 3:15
"Toys for Tots" (Sammy Fain, Paul Francis Webster) - 2:03

Personnel
 Peggy Lee - vocals
 Billy May - arranger, conductor

References

External links
[ Billboard.com]

1960 Christmas albums
Albums arranged by Billy May
Albums conducted by Billy May
Albums produced by Dave Cavanaugh
Albums recorded at Capitol Studios
Capitol Records Christmas albums
Christmas albums by American artists
Peggy Lee albums
Jazz Christmas albums